Caroline Spies (born 2 July 2002) is a Swiss ice hockey goaltender and member of the Swiss national ice hockey team, currently playing in the Swiss Women's Hockey League B (SWHL B) with the SC Langenthal Damen and in the Swiss U20-Top with the under-20 (U20) junior team of EHC Basel.

Spies represented Switzerland at the 2021 IIHF Women's World Championship, where she served as third goaltender behind starters Andrea Brändli and Saskia Maurer. As a junior player with the Swiss national under-18 team, she participated in the IIHF Women's U18 World Championships in 2018, 2019, and 2020.

References

External links
 

Living people
2002 births
Sportspeople from Basel-Landschaft
Swiss women's ice hockey goaltenders
Olympic ice hockey players of Switzerland
Ice hockey players at the 2022 Winter Olympics